The Shire of Shark Bay is a local government area of Western Australia in the Gascoyne region.  It has an area of 25,423 km2 and a population of about 950.  It is made up of two peninsulas and Shark Bay, located at the westernmost point of Australia.  There is one town in the Shire of Shark Bay, Denham, which is the administrative centre for the Shire.  There are also a number of small communities; they are Useless Loop (a now-closed mining site), Monkey Mia (a popular resort where dolphins come in), Nanga and Hamelin Pool. The Overlander and The Billabong are roadhouses.

History
The Shark Bay Road District was gazetted on 13 May 1904. In 1951 the then current officials were dismissed. On 1 July 1961, it became a shire under the Local Government Act 1960, which reformed all remaining road districts into shires.

Wards
The Shire is divided into three wards:

 Denham Ward (five councillors)
 Pastoral Ward (one councillor)
 Useless Loop Ward (one councillor)

Towns and localities
The towns and localities of the Shire of Shark Bay with population and size figures based on the most recent Australian census:

Economy
Major employers include the salt works at Useless Loop along with the fishing industry and the various retail outlets meeting the needs of the tourist industry. There are some 30 personnel employed by the Department of Environment and Conservation and twenty by the Shire. There is a primary school and a Distance Education structured secondary school. Numbers of school aged children fluctuate around the 100 mark. The Police Station is manned by 3 officers.

Local industries include tourism, fishing, salt, pearl marine culturing, mining of shell grit and various pastoral activities.

Tourism
The creation of the Shark Bay World Heritage Site has created significant impact on the community within the shire area.

Community
The Shire council produced a community newsletter title the Inscription Post from 1989 until January 2011 when it was produced by the Shark Bay Community Resource Centre.

Climate
The Shire of Shark Bay has a mild arid tropical climate, with mean daily maximum temperatures ranging from 22 °C (72 °F) in July to 32 °C (90 °F) in February.  Rainfall is low and variable, with most rain falling in the winter months and a certain amount due to cyclone activity.  The average annual rainfall is 228 mm.

Population

Heritage-listed places

As of 2021, 53 places are heritage-listed in the Shire of Shark Bay, of which three are on the State Register of Heritage Places, all on Dirk Hartog Island.

References

External links
 

 
Shark Bay